Bwendero Sugar Factory (BSF) is a sugar manufacturing establishment, under development in the Western Region of Uganda.

Location

Overview
The factory, under construction as of September 2018, is expected to be commissioned in December 2018.

According to the Daily Monitor, the factory cost USh22 billion (US$6 million), to build. Funding was raised through equity and debt.

Ownership
Bwendero Sugar Factory is owned by John Fitzgerald Magara, a Hoima-based businessman, who is also the proprietor of Bwendero Dairy Farm. BSF was the 13th sugar manufacturer to be licensed in Uganda.

See also
List of sugar manufacturers in Uganda

References

External links
Sugar Cane Growing taking over Bunyoro

Agriculture in Uganda
Hoima District
Western Region, Uganda
Sugar companies of Uganda